Javier F. Campos (born 1947) is a Chilean writer and professor of Latin American Literature, Hispanic Film, Popular Culture, Politics, Culture Studies related to Latin America at Fairfield University in Fairfield, Connecticut, USA.

Campos is a regular columnist for El Mostrador, a Latin American newspaper. He writes about several issues including social, politic and culture issues in Latin America, and Latinos in the United States of America. Campos also writes for  Sociedad & Conocimiento, a magazine from 
Department of Economic at the Universidad Central de Chile.

Short biography
Campos  was born in Santiago, Chile. He has published a novel, Los Saltimbanquis, 1999, and four books of poetry: The Last Photographs (1981), The City in Flames (1986), Forgotten Letters of the Astronaut (1991). Forgotten Letters of the Astronaut won first Prize for Hispanic Poetry in EE.UU in 1991, Letras de Oro.

In 1990 Campos was finalist in Casa de las Americas, Havana, Cuba with The Astronaut in Flames. This book was later was translated into English by Nick Hill as Letter from a Lost Astronaut.

In 2000 the American magazine of poetry, Mid America Review dedicated to Campos's poetry a Chapbook in translation.  In May 2003, a German journal dedicated a chapbook  in translation into German of Campos’ poetry.

In December 2002 Campos  won the first prize of poetry, long poem category, in the International Award. Juan Rulfo, Radio France International, for his poem entitled "Los Gatos."

In 2003 he published his first of short stories  collection, about “latinos” in USA, The woman who look like Sharon Stone.  This book got a Second Award in August 2004 for the best short story book  published in Chile during 2003. Read here some shorstories:   La mujer que se parecía a Sharon Stone https://web.archive.org/web/20050507080355/http://www.rileditores.cl/articulo/Articulo.do?m=ver&idArticulo=1069168718101

Finally, Campos received a prize for his new book of poetry in the CHICANO/LATINO LITERARY PRIZE,  University of California, Irvine in October 2005.

References

External links
Fairfield University Homepage
Javier Campos Poetry on Lanzallamas.com
 Javier Campos Poetry in Arte Poetica, Antologia de Poesia Universal
"Cartas de Campos," Review by Profesor Grínor Rojo from University of Chile
"La escritura: un espacio para el tránsito," Review by Carmen Foxley, professor from University of Chile

Chilean male writers
Fairfield University faculty
Living people
People from Santiago
1947 births